K. Rajan    is an Indian film producer and film director who has worked on Tamil films.

Career
Rajan began his career as a producer through the Tamil film, Brammacharigal (1983) starring Suresh. In 1991, he directed the film Namma Ooru Mariamma starring Nizhalgal Ravi and Sarathkumar, before working as a writer on Thangamana Thangachi (1991) for director Senthilnathan. For the films, he associated with Ganesh Cine Arts and music composers Shankar–Ganesh.

In 2000, Rajan took on the role of the president of Chennai Distributors Association. Rajan launched his son Prabhukanth as an actor in 2000, who acted in his first lead role through Aval Paavam (2000). Prabhukanth also featured as the antagonist in Doubles (2000), and later worked on Ninaikkatha Naalillai (2001), before making a return as a film director through LKG (2019). During the early 2000s, Rajan also worked on another project, Babu Ganesh's Kudumbam Oru Koiyil starring Ramki, although the project was later dropped.

In June 2005, director Rajan chose to shelve his proposed biopic of Sivakasi Jayalakshmi titled Niram Maraiya Rojakal starring Vindya. He then began working on a directorial project titled Unarchigal which would explore the life of adolescent youths and cast actresses Devayani and Sindhuri in the lead roles, alongside newcomer male actors. However a production delay meant that the film went through a change of cast and Rajan started the project with Abbas and Kunal.

In the media
K. Rajan has attracted controversy for his statements on Tamil cinema.

In June 2001, Rajan was arrested for attacking fellow producer Keyaar.

In April 2019, at the launch of the soundtrack of the film Ettuthikkum Para (2020), Rajan threatened singer Chinmayi over her claims in the Me Too movement against Vairamuthu. At the same event, director Pa. Ranjith criticised Rajan's remarks. During a public speech in December 2019, he criticised actors Kamal Haasan and Dhanush, and directors Selvaraghavan and Gautham Vasudev Menon, for their loss-making films. He made directed reference to films such as Aayirathil Oruvan (2010) and Enai Noki Paayum Thota (2019). The following month, he spoke out against Nayanthara for charging a high remuneration for her films. In 2019 and 2020, he has also publicly criticised Yogi Babu at the audio launch of Paramapadham Vilayattu (2021), Bharathirajaa for starting a rival producers' association, and the Animal Welfare Board of India for allegedly taking bribes.

Filmography
As producer
Brammacharigal (1983)
Doubles (2000)
Aval Paavam (2000)
Ninaikkatha Naalillai (2001)

As director
Namma Ooru Mariamma (1991)
Unarchigal (2005)

As writer
Thangamana Thangachi (1991)
Chinna Poovai Killathe (1992)
As actor
Michael Raj (1987)
Chinna Poovai Killathe (1992)
Ulavuthurai (1998)
En Sakhiye (2000)
Kabadi Kabadi (2001)
Veettoda mapillai(2001) 
Aadhikkam (2005)
Sorry Enaku Kalyanamayidichu (2005)
Unarchigal (2005)
Pagiri (2016)
Paambhu Sattai (2017)
Thunivu (2023)
Bakasuran (2023)

References

External links

Living people
1941 births
20th-century Indian film directors
Tamil film directors
Tamil screenwriters
Tamil film producers
Film producers from Chennai